Alexandre Pierre (born 25 February 2001) is a professional footballer who plays as a goalkeeper for Championnat National 3 side Strasbourg II. Born in France, he plays for the Haiti national team.

Club career
Pierre began his senior career with the reserves of Laval in 2018. From 2019 to 2020, he was the backup goalkeeper at the reserves of Angers. In May 2020, he signed a 3-year contract with Strasbourg, originally going to their reserves as well. He joined Annecy on loan in the Championnat National for the second half of the 2021–22 season on 2 December 2021.

International career
Born in France, Pierre is of Haitian descent. He debuted in a 0–0 CONCACAF Nations League tie with Bermuda on 4 June 2022.

References

External links
 
 
 

2001 births
Living people
Sportspeople from Aubervilliers
Haitian footballers
Haiti international footballers
French footballers
French sportspeople of Haitian descent
Association football goalkeepers
Stade Lavallois players
Angers SCO players
RC Strasbourg Alsace players
FC Annecy players
Championnat National 3 players
Black French sportspeople
Footballers from Seine-Saint-Denis